Ramaprasad Chanda (15 August 1873 – 28 May 1942) was an Indian anthropologist, historian and archaeologist from Bengal. A pioneer in his field in South Asia, Chanda's lasting legacy is the Varendra Research Museum, he established in Rajshahi (located in present-day Bangladesh), a leading institute  for research on the history of Bengal.He was the first head of the Department of Anthropology at the University of Calcutta from 1920- 1921.He was also a professional archaeologist and worked in the Archaeological Survey of India. Chanda was one of the founders the Indian Anthropological Institute and was its president during 1938–1942. He represented India in the first International Congress of Anthropology held in London in 1934.He  had done original research on the somatic characters of Indian populations by using ancient Indian literature and challenged H.H.Risley's (the first Census Commissioner of India) theory on Indian races.

Publications
 Gaudarajmala, Rajshahi: Varendra Research Society (1912)
 Indo Aryan Races, Rajshahi: Varendra Research Society (1916)
 Letters and Documents Relating to the Life of Raja Rammohan Roy

References

 

Bengali historians
Scottish Church College alumni
University of Calcutta alumni
Academic staff of the University of Calcutta
1873 births
1942 deaths
Historians in British India